P.A.O. Koufalia Football Club is a Greek football club, based in Koufalia, Thessaloniki, Greece.

Honours

Domestic

 Macedonia FCA champion: 5
 1984–85, 1996–97, 2002–03, 2008–09, 2017–18
 Macedonia FCA Cup Winners : 1
 2016–17

References

Football clubs in Central Macedonia
Thessaloniki (regional unit)
Association football clubs established in 1964
1964 establishments in Greece
Gamma Ethniki clubs